A Gentleman in Moscow is a 2016 novel by Amor Towles. It is his second novel, published five years after his  New York Times best seller, Rules of Civility (2011).

Background 
The protagonist is the fictional Count Alexander Ilyich Rostov, born in Saint Petersburg, Russia, on 24 October 1889. He was raised on his Rostov family's estate "Idlehour" in Nizhny Novgorod. Rostov's godfather was his father's comrade in the cavalry, Grand Duke Demidov. When the Count's parents died of cholera within hours of each other in 1900, Grand Duke Demidov became the 11-year-old's guardian. Demidov counseled him to be strong for his sister Helena, because "...adversity presents itself in many forms, and if a man does not master his circumstances, then he is bound to be mastered by them." The Rostov siblings are aristocrats, making social visits to nearby estates by horse-drawn troika or sleigh.

As a young man, the Count was sent out of the country (as was the custom at the time) by his grandmother for wounding Helena's suitor, a cad who broke her heart. Upon returning home from Paris after the Bolshevik revolution of 1917, the Count was arrested.

Inspiration and plot 
Towles's inspiration for the novel was his experience staying at luxury hotels, specifically, a hotel in Geneva, Switzerland, where some guests were permanent residents. He combined the idea of luxury hotels with his knowledge of Russia's long-time historical tradition of house arrest.

The trial 
The Count is charged as a social parasite before a Bolshevik tribunal, with the expectation that he will be found guilty and shot. He is unrepentant, and eloquently refuses to confess. Because of a revolutionary poem attributed to him, the Count is spared a death sentence. Instead, he is placed under house arrest for life at his current residence, the Hotel Metropol in central Moscow.

The hotel 
A military guard escorts the Count back to the Hotel Metropol, where he is ordered to vacate his luxurious suite and move to the cramped servant's quarters on the sixth floor. As time goes on, the Count cultivates a social circle of friends from his youth as well as selected residents, staff, and customers of the Hotel and its restaurants. These include a one-eyed cat, a young girl, a seamstress, a Russian chef, a French maître d'hotel and former circus juggler, a poet, an actress, an underemployed architect, an orchestra conductor, a prince, a former Red Army colonel, and an aide-de-camp of an American general.

Due to his diminished circumstances and restricted freedom, the Count has time for self-reflection. He is a brilliant conversationalist, readily discussing diverse subjects such as evolution, philosophy, Impressionism, Russian writers and poetry, food, post-revolutionary Russian society, and Russia's contributions to the world.

An early acquaintance at the hotel is nine-year-old Nina Kulikova, the daughter of a widowed Ukrainian bureaucrat, who is fascinated by princesses.

Sofia 
In 1938, an unexpected arrival changes the Count's circumstances. Nina Kulikova, now a married woman, visits the Count. She confides that her husband Leo was arrested and sentenced to five years of forced labor by the Gulag. Nina decides to follow her husband to Sevvostlag in  Kolyma, a remote region of the Soviet Union bounded by the East Siberian Sea and the Arctic Ocean. She begs the Count to accept temporary custody of her young daughter Sofia, while she makes arrangements for the child to join her in Siberia to be near her father. This is the last time the Count sees Nina, so at the age of 49, he becomes Sofia's surrogate father.

Sofia is a quiet, highly intelligent child. Her potential manifests itself during games of hide-and-seek that she wins in record time.

Later, Sofia takes piano lessons. She surprises the Count by playing a Chopin nocturne (Opus 9, number 2, in E-flat major) after only a few lessons. It is clear to both the piano teacher and the Count that Sofia is a musical prodigy.

Wine 
Many classic French and world wines are mentioned in the book. Châteauneuf-du-Pape is especially key to the storyline.

Analysis 
Towles's approach in A Gentleman in Moscow was described as a "gorgeous sleight of hand" by The New York Times:

Reception
Kirkus Reviews found the book to be "a great novel, a nonstop pleasure brimming with charm, personal wisdom, and philosophic insight. This book more than fulfills the promise of Towles' stylish debut, Rules of Civility." NPR opined that "A Gentleman in Moscow is a novel that aims to charm ... and the result is winning, stylish ... Flair is always the goal – Towles never lets anyone merely say goodbye when they could bid adieu, never puts a period where an exclamation point or dramatic ellipsis could stand." At Book Marks, a review aggregator website, the novel received a cumulative "Positive" rating based on 11 reviews: 3 "Rave", 5 "Positive", and 3 "Mixed". Camilla, Duchess of Cornwall recommended the book to those in isolation during the COVID-19 pandemic.

A Gentleman in Moscow was a finalist for the 2016 Kirkus Prize in Fiction & Literature. It was also an International Dublin Literary Award nominee (2018 longlist).

The audiobook, narrated by Nicholas Guy Smith, was an AudioFile Magazine Earphones Award winner in 2016.

Planned adaptation
In August 2017, it was reported that a limited series based on the book was in development at Entertainment One. 

In April 2018, it was announced that Kenneth Branagh would star as Count Rostov in the television series, and that Tom Harper would direct it.

In August 2022, it was announced that Ewan McGregor had replaced Branagh in the role of Count Rostov, and that it will be released on Paramount+ internationally and Showtime in the US.

References

Further reading 

2016 American novels
Novels set in Moscow
Viking Press books
Novels about political repression in the Soviet Union
Novels set in the Stalin era
Novels set in the Soviet Union
Novels set in hotels